D. J. Coffman (born January 17, 1976) is an American cartoonist. He is best known as the creator of the Hero by Night comic book series and the webcomic Yirmumah. Coffman also has done work on the Monkey Man comic series with writer Brian Lynch that included a webcomic on Kevin Smith's MoviePoopShoot.com.

Career

Yirmumah 

Yirmumah is a daily webcomic written and drawn by Coffman, and sometimes written by collaborator Bob McDeavitt. Yirmumah is part of the webcomics collective Keenspot. It has been published as a minicomic and as a color comic book series. Yirmumah was also a regular feature in the 2005 relaunch of Cracked magazine and Cracked Magazine.com.

In 2006, Coffman switched Yirmumah back to an autobiographical comic called ORIGIN  which features the story of how his father and mother met.

The Comic Book Challenge/Hero by Night 
In July 2006 Coffman and his project Hero by Night won the first annual Comic Book Challenge contest, held by comics publisher Platinum Studios and NBC.

Hero by Night tells the adventures of a Jack King, who discovers an older superhero's hidden lair and his gear. After debating selling the hero's stuff on eBay and attracting the hero's enemies' attention, King decides to instead use the gear to become the modern incarnation of the hero.

Coffman was later a judge for the 2007 Comic Book Challenge.

In December 2007, Hero By Night launched as an ongoing comic book series. After publishing three issues, Platinum suspended its comic publishing line due to financial issues. All creators on the Hero By Night book were eventually paid in full.

The Hollywood Reporter announced in October 2008 that there were plans to adapt Hero By Night into a live-action television series.

In late December 2011, Coffman announced that he had regained the rights to Hero by Night from Platinum and that he would be reinitiating the series, which would then be published daily at Keenspot.com

Flobots
On June 9, 2008, Coffman teamed with the Denver-based hip-hop/rock band Flobots to produce an original webcomic that features stories based on real life accounts of their fans meant to inspire social change. The webcomic was published at Flobots.net

The God Child
In April 2014, Coffman teamed with writer Ally Monroe to create The God Child comic series. The first chapter debuted in July 2014 at the San Diego Comic-Con International, and was later signed with Caliber Comics for the collected editions upon completion of the first story arc.

The synopsis: a secret society known as The Church has been preventing the second coming of Christ for the past millennium. Looking for redemption, and recruited by The Church, a team of gunmen and assassins stop at nothing to track and kill the carrier. Convinced that they are exterminating the antichrist, they use any means necessary to fight a secret battle to save the world and their own souls. Nothing could have prepared Maggie Lee to carry the God Child, but her life has never been fair. Being thrown out of her home at the age of 16 for being gay has endowed her with the inner strength needed to survive. With assassins on her trail and nowhere to hide, will she fight to survive to give birth to the son of God, or the anti-christ?

Golden Quill Award Winner 2017
In 2027 Coffman won a Golden Quill award, first place in lifestyle reporting for Pittsburgh City Paper, which featured a citywide bar crawl. The illustrations were drawn live in each location by Coffman on cocktail napkins. The story, art and interactive map also won best digital lifestyle story, beating out all other media outlets in Western Pennsylvania.

Children's Book Illustration
In 2017 Coffman illustrated the best selling children's book, "Despite the Height"  by WNBA All-Star Ivory Latta. The book encourages young people to push beyond their perceived limitations. In Ivory's case, she was very short, but still went on to become a WNBA All-Star

In November 2022 Coffman illustrated "Go, Discover Westmoreland", a children's history of Westmoreland County, Pennsylvania.

Draw or Die Co.
Coffman founded the Draw or Die Co. in March 2022. Draw or Die Co. is motivating visual storytellers to live a more sustainable creative life. By motivating and encouraging each other the members combat creative depression and find the tools they need to continue their creative journeys.

References

External links
 Flobots Comic
 Yirmumah
 Hero By Night
 The God Child
 

American comics creators
Living people
1976 births
Place of birth missing (living people)